Eduardo Esteban "Mono" Martínez (born 25 September 1961 in Necochea) is a retired volleyball player from Argentina. He represented his country in four Summer Olympics, starting in 1984 (Los Angeles, California).

Martínez was a member of the men's national indoor team that claimed the bronze medal at the 1988 Summer Olympics in Seoul, South Korea. In the 1990s, he started a career in beach volleyball, partnering Martín Conde in the 1996 and 2000 Summer Olympics.

References

External links
 
 

1961 births
Living people
Argentine men's volleyball players
Argentine beach volleyball players
Men's beach volleyball players
Volleyball players at the 1984 Summer Olympics
Volleyball players at the 1988 Summer Olympics
Beach volleyball players at the 1996 Summer Olympics
Beach volleyball players at the 2000 Summer Olympics
Olympic volleyball players of Argentina
Olympic beach volleyball players of Argentina
Olympic bronze medalists for Argentina
Olympic medalists in volleyball
Medalists at the 1988 Summer Olympics
Sportspeople from Buenos Aires Province